Pietronki  is a village in the administrative district of Gmina Chodzież, within Chodzież County, Greater Poland Voivodeship, in west-central Poland.

The village has a population of 149.

References

Pietronki